Leonard Arthur "Moe" White (July 28, 1919 – February 15, 2003) was a Canadian professional ice hockey forward who played four games in the National Hockey League for the Montreal Canadiens. He was born in Verdun, Quebec.

He died in Montreal in 2003.

References

External links

Leonard "Moe" White at the Legends of Hockey

1919 births
2003 deaths
Buffalo Bisons (AHL) players
Canadian ice hockey forwards
Houston Skippers players
Montreal Canadiens players
People from Verdun, Quebec
Ice hockey people from Montreal